Khokhlov or Hohlov, feminine: Khokhlova or Hohlova, is a Russian surname derived from the word khokhol.

In 2022, Russian footballer Dmitri Khokhlov sued Facebook for banning his surname due to its association with the word khokhol, which is offensive to Ukrainians.

It may refer to:

Aleksandr Khokhlov, Russian football player
Aleksandra Khokhlova, Russian actress
Dmitri Khokhlov (born 1975), Russian football player
Iryna Khokhlova (born 1990), Ukrainian-born Argentine modern pentathlete
Ivan Khokhlov (born 1895), Russian politician
Jana Khokhlova (born 1985), Russian ice dancer
Leonid Khokhlov (born 1980), Russian swimmer
Mikhail Khokhlov, Russian pianist and conductor
Nikita Khokhlov (disambiguation)
Nikolai Khokhlov (1922–2007), Soviet military officer
Olga Khokhlova (1891–1955), Ukrainian ballet dancer
Svetlana Khokhlova (born 1984), Belarusian swimmer

References 

Russian-language surnames